The Wichita Police Department (WPD) is the primary law enforcement agency serving Wichita, Kansas. Wichita Police Department’s jurisdiction overlaps with the Sedgwick County Sheriff's office.

History
The WPD made national news for the killing spree of Dennis Rader, also known as the BTK serial killer, from 1974 to 1978. He was arrested and convicted in 2005. A tissue sample from his daughter was used to confirm DNA tests that linked Rader to ten killings committed between 1974 and 1991. Homicide Unit Commander Ken Landwehr was the department's expert on the BTK killer case, so the Wichita Police Department's Chief of Police Norman D. Williams assigned Landwehr to head the BTK Task Force in 2004.

In the Herman Hill riot of 1979, 88 people were arrested and at least 51 were injured.

The Wichita Police Department, in conjunction with the Kansas Bureau of Investigation, filed the very first Federal Racketeering case in Kansas history on September 28, 2007. Two indictments name 28 defendants - all Crips Gang members - citing 4 murders, 11 attempted murders, and other crimes including arson, robbery, cocaine, and crack cocaine possession with intent to distribute and transportation of minors to engage in prostitution. According to the indictment, the Crips formed a criminal enterprise engaging in illegal activities including narcotics trafficking, drive-by shootings, and burglaries; sought to preserve and expand their power through intimidation, threats and assaults; attempted to preserve and protect themselves from interference by law enforcement; and tried to keep their victims in fear through violence and threats.

The 2017 Wichita swatting that resulted in Witchita resident Andrew Finch being fatally shot by WPD Officer Justin Rapp.

In 2021 and 2022, the WPD received national attention for its lack of action in handling racism and extremism on the force. Department managers failed to appropriately discipline Wichita Police Department members who exchanged racist, sexist and homophobic texts and images. A city report stated the police force mismanaged investigation of the incidents. A committee appointed by Wichita City Manager Robert Layton said the department must "crack down on biased police officers, poor leadership, botched investigations and poor oversight." 

Also in 2021, Chief Lemuel Moore received national attention for disciplining members of the department who had sent extremist and racist messages. Moore has criticized an investigation under his predecessor, Gordon Ramsay, that cleared most of the officers of any wrongdoing in racist messaging and ordered “non-discipline” coaching and mentoring for some of the most egregious messages. An outside organization will be hired to conduct an investigation into the extent of racism and extremism in the police force.

Demographics
, the WPD had the following demographic profile:
Male: 89%
Female: 11%
White: 82%
African-American/Black: 9%
Hispanic: 5%
Other: 3%

Awards
In 1991, Chief Rick Stone was named "Law Enforcement Officer of the Year" by the United States Marshals Service.

In 2003, the International Association of Chiefs of Police awarded the department the "Webber Seavey Excellence in Law Enforcement Award" for a project addressing violent crime in the Planeview neighborhood of Wichita.

Also in 2003, the Boy Scouts of America gave the department the "Whitney Young Jr Community Service Award" for their support of Camp Awareness, a local four-day camp for boys between the ages of 7 and 10.

See also

 2017 Wichita swatting
 List of law enforcement agencies in Kansas

References

External links

Wichita Police streaming scanner page

Police Department
Municipal police departments of Kansas